The Eumeralla River is a perennial river of the Glenelg Hopkins catchment, located in the Western District of Victoria, Australia.

Course and features
The Eumeralla River rises northeast of Macarthur, and flows generally south, and then west through the town of Macarthur, before heading south by west until the settlement of Codrington where the river flows east parallel with the coastline, joined by four tributaries including the Shaw River. The Eumeralla empties into Lake Yambuk at the Yambuk Important Bird Area and reaches its mouth south of Yambuk and spills into Portland Bay in the Great Australian Bight. The river descends  over its  course.

Etymology
The river lends its name to the Eumeralla Wars, a notable conflict of the 1840s between European settlers and the traditional Gunditjmara Aboriginal inhabitants of the land surrounding the river.

See also

 
 Thomas Alexander Browne

References 

Glenelg Hopkins catchment
Rivers of Barwon South West (region)
Western District (Victoria)